The S&P SmallCap 600 Index (S&P 600) is a stock market index established by Standard & Poor's. It covers roughly the small-cap range of American stocks, using a capitalization-weighted index.

To be included in the index, a stock must have a total market capitalization that ranges from $750 million to $4.6 billion. These market cap eligibility criteria are for addition to an index, not for continued membership. As a result, an index constituent that appears to violate criteria for addition to that index is not removed unless ongoing conditions warrant an index change.  

Additionally , same as S&P 500 and S&P 400, there is a financial viability requirement. Companies must have positive as-reported earnings over the most recent quarter, as well as over the most recent four quarters (summed together).

, the index's median market cap was $1.58 billion and covered roughly three percent of the total US stock market. These smallcap stocks cover a narrower range of capitalization than the companies covered by the Russell 2000 Smallcap index which range from $169 million to $4 billion, excluding some of the smallest companies. The S&P 400 MidCap index combined with the SmallCap 600 compose the S&P 1000, and the S&P 1000 plus the S&P 500 compose the S&P 1500. The index was launched on October 28, 1994
and its ticker symbol is either SML or ^SML.

Record values

Investing
The following exchange-traded funds (ETFs) attempt to track the performance of the index:

Index Fund
 iShares Core S&P Small-Cap ETF
 Vanguard S&P Small-Cap 600 ETF
 SPDR S&P 600 Small Cap ETF

Growth Index Fund
 iShares S&P Small-Cap 600 Growth ETF
 Vanguard S&P Small-Cap 600 Growth ETF
 SPDR S&P 600 Small Cap Growth ETF

Value Index Fund
 iShares S&P Small-Cap 600 Value ETF
 Vanguard S&P Small-Cap 600 Value ETF
 SPDR S&P 600 Small Cap Value ETF

It can be compared to the Russell 2000 Index.

Versions
The "S&P 600" generally quoted is a price return index; there are also total return and net total return versions of the index. These versions differ in how dividends are accounted for. The price return version does not account for dividends; it only captures the changes in the prices of the index components. The total return version reflects the effects of dividend reinvestment, while the net total return version takes into account dividend withholding taxes for foreign investors.

Annual returns

Components

See also

 S&P 500
 S&P 400
 Russell 2000
 S&P 1500

Notes

External links
 Yahoo Finance page for ^SP600
 Bloomberg page for SML:IND
 Standard & Poor's page for S&P SmallCap 600 Index

0600
American stock market indices